Trouble in Store is a 1953 comedy film starring Norman Wisdom. The title may also refer to:
Trouble in Store (1934 film), another comedy
"Trouble in Store", an episode of the animated television show Tales from the Cryptkeeper
"Trouble in Store", an episode of the animated television sitcom The Goode Family
"Trouble in Store", an episode of the American animated show Brandy & Mr. Whiskers
"Trouble in Store", an episode of the British children's show ChuckleVision
"Trouble in Store", an episode of the BBC documentary series Traffic Cops